Dimethylaniline monooxygenase [N-oxide-forming] 4 is an enzyme that in humans is encoded by the FMO4 gene.

Function 

Metabolic N-oxidation of the diet-derived amino-trimethylamine (TMA) is mediated by flavin-containing monooxygenase and is subject to an inherited FMO3 polymorphism in man resulting in a small subpopulation with reduced TMA N-oxidation capacity resulting in fish odor syndrome Trimethylaminuria. Three forms of the enzyme, FMO1 found in fetal liver, FMO2 found in adult liver, and FMO3 are encoded by genes clustered in the 1q23-q25 region.   Flavin-containing monooxygenases are NADPH-dependent flavoenzymes that catalyzes the oxidation of soft nucleophilic heteroatom centers in drugs, pesticides, and xenobiotics.

Cancer 
FMO4 gene has been observed progressively downregulated in Human papillomavirus-positive neoplastic keratinocytes derived from uterine cervical  preneoplastic lesions at different levels of malignancy.  For this reason, FMO4 is likely to be associated with tumorigenesis and may be a potential prognostic marker for uterine cervical  preneoplastic lesions progression.

References

Further reading